
Higgins may refer to:

People 
 Higgins (surname), including list of people with the surname (see also Ó hUiginn)

Places 
 Higgins, Australian Capital Territory, a suburb in the Canberra district of Belconnen
 Higgins, North Carolina, populated place in Yancey County, North Carolina, USA
 Higgins, Texas, city in Lipscomb County, Texas, USA
 Higgins Township, Michigan, USA
 Higgins Beach, small beach in Maine, USA
 Higgins Field, a World War II airbase on the northern tip of Cape York Peninsula in Queensland, Australia
 Higgins Lake, in Michigan, USA
 Division of Higgins, Australian Electoral Division in Victoria

Other 
 Higgins (dog), trained dog actor in Benji and Petticoat Junction
 Higgins boat, or LCVP, a landing craft used in amphibious warfare
 Higgins Industries, a US firm that manufactured the Higgins boat
 Higgins project, an open source framework for user-centric identity management
 Higgins Armory Museum, in Worcester, Massachusetts, USA
 Higgins Glass, art glass
 Higgins Building, building in Los Angeles, California, USA
 Jonathan Higgins, fictional character in the American television TV series Magnum, P.I.

See also
 Justice Higgins (disambiguation)